Holum is a surname. Notable people with the surname include:

Dianne Holum (born 1951), American speed skater
John D. Holum (born 1940), American government official
Kirstin Holum (born 1980), American speed skater, daughter of Dianne